The Samsung Galaxy S9 and S9+ are Android-based smartphones unveiled, manufactured, released and marketed by Samsung Electronics as part of the Samsung Galaxy S series. The devices were revealed at the Mobile World Congress in Barcelona on 25 February 2018, as the successors to the Samsung Galaxy S8 and S8+.

The Galaxy S9 and S9+ have nearly identical features to the S8 models, with the same display sizes and aspect ratio as their predecessors. One highly regarded change to distinguish between the models is the location of the fingerprint sensor. While the S8's is found beside the camera, the S9's is directly underneath it. Most notably, however, the S9 line is equipped with several camera improvements over the S8.

The phone received generally favorable reviews, with critics mostly noting the enhanced camera and better positioned fingerprint scanner. Critics, however, still criticize the lack of improvement to other features compared to its predecessor. It is available in seven colours (Lilac Purple, Midnight Black, Titanium Gray, Coral Blue, Sunrise Gold, Burgundy Red, and Polaris Blue). It was succeeded by the Samsung Galaxy S10 in March 2019.

Launch 
Many Galaxy S9 features and design changes were leaked weeks before the official launch, and the official launch video was leaked a few hours prior to the unveiling.

Specifications

Hardware

Display 
On the front, the Galaxy S9 and S9+ look identical to the S8 and S8+. They both feature 1440p Super AMOLED displays, with an 18.5:9 aspect ratio. The S9 has a 5.8-inch panel, while the S9+ uses a larger 6.2-inch panel. The displays have curved sides that slope over the horizontal edges of the device.

Cameras 
The cameras on both phones received improvements. The S9+ has a dual-lens camera setup on the back, like on the Galaxy Note 8, while the S9 only has a single camera on the back. The Exynos variants of the phones received Samsung's in-house ISOCELL S5K2L3 camera sensor whereas the Snapdragon variant made use of Sony's Exmor IMX345 counterpart. Both phones have a Dual Aperture rear camera which can switch between 1.5 and 2.4, depending on lighting conditions, making it the first mobile phone since the Nokia N86 (2009) with a variable aperture camera.

The phones can record video with 4K (2160p) at 60 frames per second (limited to 5 minutes), 1080p at 240 frames per second and 960 frames per second "Super Slo-Motion " video at 720p for 0.2 seconds, all three of which have been featured on any Samsung flagship phone for the first time. The first two frame rates are the first increase in the series since the 2014 Samsung Galaxy S5.

AR Emoji, similar to Apple's Animoji feature on the iPhone X, is a new feature that lets the user make emojis based on themselves with the help of augmented reality face recognition. Third-party app support is provided for this feature.

A software update retrofitted the Galaxy Note 9 feature of warning the user about flaws in photos such as blinking eyes and blur.

Chipsets and storage 
In most countries, the S9 and S9+ both come with a Samsung Exynos 9810 SoC. Versions sold in the United States, Canada, China, Hong Kong, Japan, and Latin America come with the Qualcomm Snapdragon 845 SoC instead.

The S9 comes with 4 GB of RAM, while the S9+ comes with 6 GB. Both devices came initially only with 64 GB of internal storage; variants with 128 and 256 GB were released in May 2018, after the internal storage of 64 GB was criticized by many as being too low, but they can only be ordered via Samsung's website. Both phones feature the ability to use a microSD card to expand the storage to a maximum of 400 GB.

Batteries 
The battery capacities are the same as their predecessors, namely 3000 mAh for the S9, and 3500 mAh for the S9+. The batteries are not user-replaceable. Just like its predecessor, the S9 supports AirFuel Inductive (formerly PMA) and Wireless Power Consortium's Qi wireless charging standards.

Wired charging allows for rates up to 15 watts via Qualcomm Quick Charge 2.0, while wireless charging is possible with rates up to 10 watts.

Audio 
The S9 and S9+ have stereo speakers tuned by AKG, as well as Dolby Atmos surround sound support; furthermore, the S9 and S9+ are two of the few smartphones that still retain the 3.5mm headphone jack.

Exterior 
Where the S9 and S9+ have the most noticeable change from the S8 line is on the back of the phone. The fingerprint sensor has been moved from the right of the camera to a more centralized location just below the camera  like on the Galaxy A8 and A8+ for convenience. A more secure unlocking method has been added, where face recognition and iris scanning have been merged into one and called Intelligent Scan.

There are also several construction improvements compared to S8 and S8+ models, mostly to increase physical durability, such as thicker glass, thicker metal rim and different (less prone to deformation) metal alloy used for the frame.

Software 
The S9 and S9+ ship with Android 8.0 "Oreo", with Google Mobile Services and the Samsung Experience user interface and software suite. It is mainly unchanged over the versions found on the S8 and Note 8, but adds additional features such as new customization options, live language translation in the camera app, and landscape (horizontal) orientation support for the Samsung home screen, a lack of which the Galaxy S3 has been criticized for, including by Evan Blass, in 2012.

The S9 and S9+ also support Project Treble, making it easier to update than previous generations of Galaxy Devices.

In December 2018, Samsung began to release Android 9.0 "Pie" for the S9. This update introduces a major revamp of Samsung's Android user experience known as One UI. A main design element of One UI is intentional repositioning of key user interface elements in stock apps to improve usability on large screens: many apps include large headers that push the beginning of content towards the center of the display, while navigation controls and other prompts are often displayed near the bottom of the display instead. As of May 2021, the S9 also supports updating to Android 10.

Advertising 
In mid-2018, Samsung published a series of mockery commercials named "Ingenius" against iPhones' lack of the Galaxy S9's functionality, including an audio connector, memory card expandable storage, as well as allegedly inferior network transfer rates and camera performance.

In one of those commercials, an unhappy customer failed to locate a memory card slot on her iPhone, to which the Apple Store employee told her that the device lacks such, and suggested her in one word to rely on cloud storage as storage expansion instead, even though it depends on Internet access to function and has slow transfer rates and high latency compared to memory cards. The customer stated that she did not "want her stuff up there", but locally, to which the Apple store employee suggested purchasing a model with more internal storage.

Reception 
John McCann from TechRadar complimented the improved camera and the new location of the fingerprint sensor, but criticized that it was too similar to its predecessor (Galaxy S8) and had limited AR Emoji functionality.

Brian Heater of TechCrunch reviewed the S9+ on 8 March 2018, and said that the phone is built on the "success [of the S8] in a number of ways".

Computerworld gave the phone a positive review and said it was "measurably better than its predecessor", but did note there wasn't a new feature that was particularly "exciting". PC Magazine also gave the Galaxy S9 and S9+ positive reviews.

CNBC's Todd Haselton said on 8 March that the S9+ was superior to the S9, for reasons such as the larger screen and second camera, as well as more RAM and battery power.

Samuel Gibbs from The Guardian gave the S9+ 5/5 stars, with the headline it was "the best big-screen smartphone by miles". Screen and camera were praised, but the review noted battery life could be better. He also appreciated the inclusion of a headphone jack, despite many other phones not having one.

The larger S9+'s camera received a score of 99 from DxOMark, which, at the time was the highest score awarded by them to a mobile device camera. It was soon surpassed by the Huawei P20 and P20 Pro, which scored 102 and 109 respectively.

Dan Seifert of The Verge gave the S9 a score of 8.5, stating that its performance, camera and design were satisfactory. However, he was not amused by the average battery life and the addition of Bixby, also saying that Samsung has a poor history of updating their smartphones.

Sales 
Samsung has described the sales of the Galaxy S9 as "slow" in their Q2 2018 earning report. Analysts predicted that the phone would be the worst selling Galaxy S flagship since the Samsung Galaxy S5. During its first two sales quarters, a record low 19.2 million units were sold.

Issues

Touchscreen issues 
About a week after the release of the devices, users started experiencing an issue in the touchscreen, where it would fail to register input in any particular area of the screen, even after a factory reset. This was termed as "dead zones" by the users. Samsung has responded by issuing a statement that they were "looking into a limited number of reports of Galaxy S9/S9+ touchscreen responsiveness issues".

Black Crush issues 
Some users of the Galaxy S9 have reported the so-called "Black Crush" issues, where the display has issues displaying different shades of dark colors. Samsung has responded with a statement that they are aware of "a limited number of reports of Galaxy S9/S9+ displaying dark colors differently than intended in certain instances" but has not provided an official fix for it yet.

Battery life issues 
Many users with the Exynos variant of the phone experienced subpar battery life. Analysts discovered that the four Samsung-designed cores had been poorly tuned, resulting in decreased battery life. This issue, however, has been addressed in part with the release of the August 2018 update.

Exynos 9810 performance 
In previous Galaxy S phones, the Exynos processor performed similar to the Snapdragon version. The S9 powered by the Exynos 9810 performed relatively slow  for a flagship and compared to the Snapdragon-powered S9. This was not very evident in synthetic benchmarks, but more so in benchmarks that simulated real world performance, such as PCMark.

See also 
 Samsung Galaxy
 Samsung Galaxy S series

References

External links 
 

Android (operating system) devices
Discontinued flagship smartphones
Samsung smartphones
Mobile phones introduced in 2018
Samsung Galaxy
Mobile phones with multiple rear cameras
Mobile phones with 4K video recording
Mobile phones with pressure-sensitive touch screen
Discontinued smartphones